Centromere protein L is a protein that in humans is encoded by the CENPL gene.

References

External links

Further reading